James Podoley (September 16, 1933 – January 24, 2010) was an American football halfback and end for the Washington Redskins of the National Football League (NFL). Born in Mount Morris, Michigan, he played college football at Central Michigan University and was drafted in the fourth round of the 1957 NFL Draft.

Podoley played for the Redskins from 1957 to 1960.  In July 1961, he was involved in a three-team trade with the Redskins, Dallas Cowboys and New York Giants.  The Giants received Podoley and end Joe Walton from the Redskins, the Redskins received Fred Dugan from the Cowboys and placekicker John Aveni, end Jerry Daniels, and defensive halfback Dave Whitsell from the Giants, and the Cowboys received placekicker Allen Green and a sixth round for the 1962 NFL Draft from the Giants that the team later used to draft George Andrie.
  However, Podoley retired instead.

Podoley died from melanoma on January 24, 2010, at the age of 76 in Bowie, Maryland.

References

External links
Obituary

1933 births
2010 deaths
American football halfbacks
Deaths from cancer in Michigan
Central Michigan Chippewas football players
Deaths from melanoma
Eastern Conference Pro Bowl players
Players of American football from Michigan
Washington Redskins players
People from Genesee County, Michigan